Adhi College of Engineering and Technology (ACET)  is an engineering college located at Oragadam, Chennai, Tamil Nadu, India. The college was started at 2008 in the memory of politician Munu Adhi. and was approved by All India Council of Technical Education (AICTE), New Delhi.

History

Initial years 
The college was started in 2008 with four engineering undergraduate courses  in disciplines of electronics and communication engineering, computer science engineering, electrical engineering, information technology and one postgraduate course in the discipline of Master of Business Administration and later two undergraduate courses in disciplines of mechanical engineering and civil engineering.

Expansion 

In 2014 the college added two engineering postgraduate courses in the discipline of M.E. Communications system, M.E. Engineering design process. In the academic year of 2016–2017 the college added four doctorate courses in the discipline of electronics and communication engineering, mechanical engineering, physics and chemistry.

Accreditations 

The college is an ISO 9001:2008 certified institution. It is approved by AICTE. The college has Recognized U/S 12(B) and 2(F)  of UGC ACT 1956

International Mou's 

ACET has signed many memoranda of understanding with foreign university which includes:

 Steinbeis-Hochschule Berlin
 German Center Advanced Studies
 Austin University
 Wolkite University

Facilities 

ACET has research facilities for  Electronics and Communication Engineering, Mechanical engineering, Physics and Chemistry. The college library has more than 16000 books and 45 subscription with National and International journals. The college auditorium has a seating capacity of 1200. The college has an athletic track, two Volleyball Courts, a basketball court, a football court, a ball badminton court.

See also 

 Anna University
 Anna University Chennai

References

External links 

 

Colleges affiliated to Anna University
Engineering colleges in Chennai
Private engineering colleges in Tamil Nadu
2008 establishments in Tamil Nadu
Educational institutions established in 2008